The Ohio River Museum is a museum that interprets the history of the Ohio River.  The museum is situated on the Muskingum River, near its confluence with the Ohio River, in Marietta, Ohio. Opened on March 16, 1941, the museum celebrated its 75th anniversary in 2016.

Among the museum's collection is the W.P. Snyder, Jr., the last steam-powered towboat on the river.

The oldest remaining pilothouse is from the steamboat Tell City. The steamboat was built in 1889 and used to carry passengers and freight on the Ohio River. She was named after the city of Tell City, Indiana, on the banks of the Ohio River. She sank on April 6, 1917, in Little Hocking, Ohio. The pilothouse survived the sinking and is on display outside of the museum.

The museum is located a block from the Campus Martius Museum.

References

External links 
 Ohio River Museum - Ohio History Connection

Ohio River
Maritime museums in Ohio
Museums in Washington County, Ohio
Buildings and structures in Marietta, Ohio
Ohio History Connection